Yarnall is a surname. Notable people with the surname include:

Bert Yarnall (1892–1943), Scottish footballer
Celeste Yarnall (1944–2018), American actress
Ed Yarnall (born 1975), American baseball player
John Yarnall (1786–1915), American military officer
Rusty Yarnall (1902–1985), American baseball player

See also
C. Yarnall Abbott (1870–1938), American painter
Robert Yarnall Richie (1908–1984), American photographer